Mowry House may refer to:

 William Mowry House, a house in North Smithfield, RI, listed on the NRHP in Rhode Island
 Tyler Mowry House, a house in North Smithfield, RI, listed on the NRHP in Rhode Island
 Roger Mowry Tavern, a demolished house in Providence, RI, listed on the NRHP in Rhode Island